Diarmuid Horan (born 1988) is an Irish hurler who played as a left wing-back for the Offaly senior hurling team.

Horan made his first appearance for the team during the 200 National League and was a regular member of the starting fifteen until he left the panel prior to the 2009 championship. During that time he experienced little success. Horan returned to inter-county hurling with Offaly in 2012.

At club level Horan plays with the St Rynagh's club.

Horan's father, Pádraig, and his brother Cathal, also played hurling with Offaly.

References

1988 births
Living people
St Rynagh's hurlers
Offaly inter-county hurlers